Parc des Sports is a multi-purpose stadium in Annecy, France. It is used by FC Annecy as the club’s home ground. The capacity of the stadium is 15,660 spectators. It also hosted the 1998 World Junior Championships in Athletics.

References

External links
 Stadium information

Football venues in France
Athletics (track and field) venues in France
FC Annecy
Thonon Evian Grand Genève F.C.
Sports venues in Haute-Savoie
Sport in Annecy
Sports venues completed in 1964